Dark Candy is the 14th studio album by Chara, which was released on April 13, 2011. Dark Candy was released in two versions: a limited edition CD+DVD version (UMCK-9417) as well as a regular CD Only version (UMCK-1382).

This album was Chara's second studio album that wasn't preceded by any singles or promotional tracks, the first being her 2005 effort "something blue". The style of "Dark Candy" is mainly urban with influences from many genres such as electronica, rock, reggae, jazz and ambient.

Track listing

Japan sales rankings

References 

 	
http://www.universal-music.co.jp/chara/products/umck-9417/

Chara (singer) albums
2011 albums